The North Main Street Historic District in Bolivar, Tennessee is a  historic district which was listed on the National Register of Historic Places in 1980.  It then included 25 contributing buildings and 11 non-contributing ones.

It includes portions of N. Main, Sycamore, Jefferson, Washing, and Water Streets.

Notable buildings include:
Baker House (c.1849), also known as "Mansion House", at 517 North Main Street, is a Greek Revival house with a two-story portico having paired columns with volutes (see photo #1 in accompanying photos).

References

Historic districts on the National Register of Historic Places in Tennessee
Greek Revival architecture in Tennessee
Victorian architecture in Tennessee
Hardeman County, Tennessee